Mohamed Fayez Sbait Khalifa Al-Alawi (born 6 October 1989) is an Emarati footballer who plays as a left back.

Fayez was born in Ghana. A midfielder, he did not take part in the 2010 AFC Champions League.

Honours

Club
Al Ain
UAE Pro League: 2011–12, 2012–13, 2014–15, 2017–18
UAE League Cup: 2008–09
UAE President's Cup: 2008–09, 2013–14, 2017–18
UAE Super Cup: 2009, 2012, 2015
Emirati-Moroccan Super Cup: 2015
AFC Champions League runner-up: 2016
FIFA Club World Cup runner-up: 2018

Individual
 Fans' Asian Champions League XI: 2016

References

External links

 
 Mohammed Fayez at UAEProLeague
 
 

Emirati footballers
Al Ain FC players
1989 births
Living people
United Arab Emirates international footballers
UAE Pro League players
Association football fullbacks